Catherine A. Merriman (born in London) is an English novelist and short story writer who has lived in South East Wales since 1973. Her work often addresses the experiences of women.

Writings
Merriman has published five novels and three short story collections. Her first novel, Leaving the Light On, won the Ruth Hadden Memorial Award in 1992. Her collection of stories, Silly Mothers, was shortlisted for 1992 Wales Book of the Year, and she has twice won a Rhys Davies short story award, in 1991 and 1998. Many of her short stories have been broadcast on BBC Radio 4.

She also edited Laughing, Not Laughing: Women Writing on 'My Experience of Sex''', an anthology of Welsh women writing frankly about their sexual experiences, which won the publications category of the 2004 Erotic Awards.

Her writing often addresses women's experiences. State of Desire addresses reawakening sexuality after bereavement. Merriman states that two of her novels (Leaving The Light On and Fatal Observations), about domestic power and domestic violence, have their foundations in her eleven years' experience as a volunteer for the charity Women's Aid.

Merriman taught writing for ten years at the University of South Wales, the erstwhile University of Glamorgan. She is a fellow of the Welsh Academy and until recently was co-chair of their members' committee.Academi: Members Committee  (accessed 18 February 2009) For several years she was fiction editor for the New Welsh Review, and she has judged numerous short story competitions.

Publications
NovelsLeaving the Light On (1992)Fatal Observations (1993)State of Desire (1996)Broken Glass (1998)Brotherhood (2003)

Short story collectionsSilly Mothers  (1991)Of Sons and Stars (1997)Getting a Life (2001)

EditorLaughing, Not Laughing: Women Writing on 'My Experience of Sex''' (Honno; 2004)

References

External links
Academi: biography
University of Glamorgan: biography
University of Glamorgan: MPhil tutors
'Mammary orgasmic potential -- a case study' & 'Learning to speak Klingon' (two short stories available online)

20th-century English novelists
21st-century English novelists
English short story writers
Academics of the University of Glamorgan
Living people
Year of birth missing (living people)
20th-century British short story writers
21st-century British short story writers